The 2013 Swiss Open Grand Prix Gold was a badminton tournament held in St. Jakobshalle, Basel, Switzerland from March 12 until March 17, 2013. It was the second grand prix gold and grand prix tournament of the 2013 BWF Grand Prix Gold and Grand Prix. It had a total purse of $125,000.

Men's singles

Seeds

  Du Pengyu (final)
  Sony Dwi Kuncoro (withdrew)
  Hu Yun (semi-final)
  Jan Ø. Jørgensen (semi-final)
  Kashyap Parupalli (third round)
  Daren Liew (second round)
  Boonsak Ponsana (second round)
  Hans-Kristian Vittinghus (quarter-final)
  Chong Wei Feng (quarter-final)
  Wong Wing Ki (third round)
  Wang Zhengming (champion)
  Viktor Axelsen (second round)
  Takuma Ueda (quarter-final)
  Dionysius Hayom Rumbaka (third round)
  Chou Tien-chen (quarter-final)
  Hsu Jen-hao (third round)

Finals

Top half

Section 1

Section 2

Section 3

Section 4

Bottom half

Section 5

Section 6

Section 7

Section 8

Women's singles

Seeds

  Saina Nehwal (semi-final)
  Juliane Schenk (quarter-final)
  Sung Ji-hyun (first round)
  Wang Shixian (champion)
  Ratchanok Inthanon (final)
  Tai Tzu-ying (quarter-final)
  Jiang Yanjiao (quarter-final)
  Bae Youn-joo (quarter-final)

Finals

Top half

Section 1

Section 2

Bottom half

Section 3

Section 4

Men's doubles

Seeds

  Ko Sung-hyun / Lee Yong-dae (final)
  Kim Ki-jung / Kim Sa-rang (quarter-final)
  Hoon Thien How / Tan Wee Kiong (quarter-final)
  Angga Pratama / Ryan Agung Saputro (second round)
  Mohammad Ahsan / Hendra Setiawan (second round)
  Chai Biao / Hong Wei (champion)
  Ingo Kindervater / Johannes Schoettler (first round)
  Goh V Shem / Lim Khim Wah (quarter-final)

Finals

Top half

Section 1

Section 2

Bottom half

Section 3

Section 4

Women's doubles

Seeds

  Christinna Pedersen / Kamilla Rytter Juhl (semi-final)
  Eom Hye-won / Jang Ye-na (quarter-final)
  Jung Kyung-eun / Kim Ha-na (champion)
  Duanganong Aroonkesorn / Kunchala Voravichitchaikul (quarter-final)
  Bao Yixin / Wang Xiaoli (first round)
  Pia Zebadiah / Rizki Amelia Pradipta (quarter-final)
  Anneke Feinya Agustin / Nitya Krishinda Maheswari (first round)
  Choi Hye-in / Kim So-young (quarter-final)

Finals

Top half

Section 1

Section 2

Bottom half

Section 3

Section 4

Mixed doubles

Seeds

  Tontowi Ahmad / Lilyana Natsir (semi-final)
  Joachim Fischer Nielsen / Christinna Pedersen (champion)
  Muhammad Rijal / Debby Susanto (quarter-final)
  Danny Bawa Chrisnanta / Vanessa Neo Yu Yan (second round)
  Markis Kido / Pia Zebadiah (quarter-final)
  Michael Fuchs / Birgit Michels (semi-final)
  Sudket Prapakamol / Kunchala Voravichitchaikul (second round)
  Mads Pieler Kolding / Kamilla Rytter Juhl (second round)

Finals

Top half

Section 1

Section 2

Bottom half

Section 3

Section 4

References

Swiss Open (badminton)
Swiss Open Grand Prix Gold
Swiss Open Grand Prix Gold
Sports competitions in Basel
BWF Grand Prix Gold and Grand Prix